Alois Lampert (19 August 1932 – 1 February 1977) was a Liechtenstein cyclist. He competed in the individual road race event at the 1952 Summer Olympics.

References

External links
 

1932 births
1977 deaths
Liechtenstein male cyclists
Olympic cyclists of Liechtenstein
Cyclists at the 1952 Summer Olympics